Charik is a village in Moga district of Punjab, India.  It is one of the largest villages of Punjab by population.

Geography
It is located 10 km towards South from District headquarters Moga. 173 km from State capital Chandigarh

History 

Before 1947 it was part of princely state Kalsia.
Shaheed Baba Khushaal Singh Ji died in a battle of Sikhism in earlier history.

See also 
Moga

References 

Cities and towns in Moga district